Herbert 'Bob' Gladstone Wookey (1888 – 1953) was a Canadian first-class cricketer.

Wookey was born in Canada in 1883. A member of the Toronto Cricket Club, he made a single appearance in first-class cricket for a combined Canada and United States of America cricket team against the touring Australians at Toronto in 1913. Playing as a bowler in the Canada/United States side, he took the wickets of Leslie Cody, Percival Arnott and Granville Down for the cost of 99 runs. Batting twice in the match, he was unbeaten without scoring in the Canada/United States first innings of 182 all out, while in their second innings he was dismissed for 2 runs by Charlie Macartney, with the Australians winning the match by an innings and 147 runs. Wookey died in the United States in 1953.

References

External links

1888 births
1953 deaths
Canadian cricketers
Canada and United States of America cricketers